Hasht Behesht is an Iranian Comedy series. The series is directed by Saeed Alemzadeh.

About the series 
The series was supposed to be make in three 30-episode seasons, but only one season was make! The first season aired on Channel IRIB Shoma in 2012 and has since been rebroadcast on Channel IRIB TV3 and iFilm. Almost 50 actors have played roles in this series.

Storyline 
There is a bazaar called the exhibition of handicrafts and food, which is specific to all Iranian ethnic groups, and all ethnic groups participate in this exhibition. There are two hotels near the bazaar that belong to two brothers who have a dispute over their father's inheritance. The existence of a bazaar and the arrival of Iranian tribes from other cities causes another competition between these two brothers,Which creates interesting events.

Cast 
 Hushang Harirchiyan
 Hassan Eklili
 Afshin Sangchap
 Alireza Jafari
 Mani Heidari
 Afsaneh Naseri
 Mehdi Saki
 Mohammad Reza Zhaleh
 Azadeh Riazi 
 Hassan Joveireh
 Farajollah Golsefidi
 Dariush Movafagh
 Danial Hajibarat
 Sanaz Zarrinmehr
 Mana Bahrami
 Iman Mortazavi
 Zohreh Molavi
 Pari Karbalaei
 Vanoosheh Vahedi
 Aram Yousefinia

References

External links
 

Iranian television series
2010s Iranian television series